Camillo Arduino (19 March 1896 – 23 July 1988) was an Italian cyclist. He competed in two events at the 1920 Summer Olympics.

References

External links
 

1896 births
1988 deaths
Italian male cyclists
Olympic cyclists of Italy
Cyclists at the 1920 Summer Olympics
Cyclists from Turin